Laurel Caverns is the largest cave in Pennsylvania by volume and area. Split into two sections, its entrance into the upper cavern is a network of interconnecting grid-like passages, while its unlit lower cavern, known as its branch-work, consists of subterranean watercourses into a dendritic system of passages. Laurel Caverns features an array of speleological and pseudokarsts formations. Its average temperature is 52°F (11° C).

It is a privately owned show cave founded in 1968.  Before this, it was an unregulated wild cave known by locals and word of mouth.  Since its founding, the upper cave has had its rocky floor filled with sand from within the cave, lending safeness to its tours along with the addition of lighting.

The steep slope of some passageways on this tour causes an optical illusion known as a gravity hill. The illusion of a ball rolling uphill is an illustration of this effect and a mainstay for the business' one-hour guided family tour of the network.

The business's specialty is a three-hour tour of its lower branchwork which is unlit.  Here the terrain is unaltered as the tour requires a proper helmet and lighting, along with climbing and crawling over breakdown piles and other obstructions to see some of the caverns' most spacious chambers and chasmal courses. 

Its location sits surrounded by Pennsylvania gamelands and doesn't interfere with designated hunting seasons of the region.  As a popular destination for school field trips, it upholds a strict no firearms policy and serves as a wildlife viewing locale during operations to tourists.  The business also features other accommodations such as a gift shop, mini-golf course, panning for gemstones, and fossils activities.

References

External links
Official Laurel Caverns website
Show Caves of the United States: Laurel Caverns

Caves of Pennsylvania
Landforms of Fayette County, Pennsylvania
Gravity hills
Cave
Tourist attractions in Fayette County, Pennsylvania